

Matches
Scores and results list France's points tally first.

Touring party

Manager: 
Assistant manager: 
Captain:

References

Rugby union tours of Australia
Rugby union tours of Romania
France national rugby union team tours
History of rugby union matches between Australia and France
France rugby union tour of Romania and Australia
France rugby union tour of Romania and Australia
France rugby union tour of Romania and Australia